The Stephen Hawking Medal for Science Communication is an honor bestowed by the Starmus Festival to individuals in science and the arts to recognize the work of those helping to promote the public awareness of science.

History
The Stephen Hawking Medal for Science Communication was initially announced on December 16, 2015, at the Royal Society in London, by a panel including Professor Stephen Hawking, the Starmus founding director Professor Garik Israelian, Dr. Brian May, Professor Richard Dawkins, Alexei Leonov and Nobel laureate Sir Harold Kroto.

The Stephen Hawking Medals are awarded to the Science Communicator of the Year in three categories:

Music & Arts
Science Writing
Films & Entertainment
 Lifetime Achievement

During the presentation of the Medal, Stephen Hawking said:

"I am delighted to present the Stephen Hawking Medal for Science Communication to be awarded at STARMUS festivals. This medal will recognize excellence in science communication across different media, whether in writing, broadcasting, music, film, or fine art. This takes account of the great diversity, richness, creativity, and scope that science communicators use to reach a wide popular audience... I am very pleased to support and honour the work of science communicators, and look forward to awarding The Stephen Hawking Medal at STARMUS Festivals."

The first Stephen Hawking Medals for Science Communication were awarded at the third Starmus Festival in June 2016. The winners were selected by Stephen Hawking himself and received the Medal from him.

Professor Hawking said of the award:
By engaging with everyone from school children to politicians to pensioners, science communicators put science right at the heart of daily life. Bringing science to the people brings people into science. This matters to me, to you, to the world as a whole.

After Starmus III, the Starmus Advisory Board joined Stephen Hawking in the selection of winners.

The medal
The design of the medal used a portrait of Professor Hawking by cosmonaut Alexei Leonov, the first man to perform a spacewalk and member of the Advisory Board of Starmus since its first edition. The other side combines the image of Alexei Leonov during the first spacewalk, and the “Red Special” – Brian May’s guitar – to demonstrate music, another major component of the Starmus Festival.
The Medal itself was designed by Alexei Leonov and Brian May.

Brian May said about the Medal:
"The Stephen Hawking Medal will be awarded for the first time at Starmus III to the human being who by their sharing of science and music with us all, is the greatest inspiration to the next generation of artists and scientists."

During the Stephen Hawking Medal Award Ceremony at Starmus III, Alexei Leonov pointed out:
"I did a sketch of Stephen Hawking… and when I showed it to him, I saw a big smile on his face. The Stephen Hawking Medal created by STARMUS will be awarded to the best science communicators in the world in three categories: science and/or science-fiction writers, musicians and artists, and people in the film and entertainment industry. I am honoured to be a part of this historical medal."

Recipients

2016
Music & Arts: Hans Zimmer
Science writing: Jim Al-Khalili
Films & Entertainment: Science documentary Particle Fever

2017
Music & Arts: Jean-Michel Jarre
Science Writing: Neil deGrasse Tyson
Films & Entertainment: Sitcom The Big Bang Theory

2019
Music & Arts: Brian Eno
Science Writing: Elon Musk
Films & Entertainment: Science documentary Apollo 11
Lifetime Achievement: Buzz Aldrin

2022
 Music & Arts:Brian May
 Science Writing: Diane Ackerman
 Films & Entertainment: NASA TV and Communications Office
 Lifetime Achievement:Jane Goodall

References

External links
Starmus: Medal Home Page
Guardian Newspaper: 2016 Winners
Astronomy Magazine: Announcement about institution of medal

Science communication awards
Awards established in 2015